Killer Be Killed is the debut studio album by American heavy metal supergroup Killer Be Killed featuring Greg Puciato of the Dillinger Escape Plan, Max Cavalera of Soulfly/ex-Sepultura, Troy Sanders of Mastodon, and Dave Elitch of the Mars Volta. It was recorded in September 2013 at Fortress Studio in Los Angeles and released May 9, 2014 via Nuclear Blast Records. The album reached No. 58 on the U.S. Billboard 200 during its first week of release and sold around 5,500 copies.

Reception

Killer Be Killed has been well received by critics. Writing for All About the Rock, Zack Slabbert said "From the opening track till the closing track this album thrusts into your mind and takes over. The vocals, guitaring, drumming and bass on this album is flawless." Alkahest of MetalSucks writes that Killer Be Killed "is a proper culmination of influences that represents each member's artistic lineage and talents in a manner that does each act's legacy justice."

Track listing

Credits
Killer Be Killed
 Greg Puciato – vocals, rhythm guitar
 Max Cavalera – vocals, rhythm guitar
 Troy Sanders – bass, vocals
 David Elitch – drums, percussion

Additional musicians
 Juan Montoya – lead guitar

Production
 Josh Wilbur – production, mixing, mastering, engineering
 Paul Suarez – engineering
 Monte Conner – A&R

Artwork
 Ryan Clark – art direction, design
 Glen La Ferman – band photography

Management
 Gloria Cavalera - Management representation for Max Cavalera
 Nick John - Management representation for Troy Sanders
 Ryan J. Downey - Management representation for Greg Puciato

References

External links
Killer Be Killed official Facebook page

2014 debut albums
Nuclear Blast albums
Killer Be Killed albums